Highway 682 is a highway in the Canadian province of Saskatchewan. It runs from Highway 41 near Meskanaw to the southern terminal of the Weldon Ferry across the South Saskatchewan River, which connects to Highway 302.

Highway 682 also passes near the communities of Kinistino and Weldon. It connects with Highways 3 and 778.

See also 
Roads in Saskatchewan
Transportation in Saskatchewan

References 

682